Ballston Spa High School is a public high school located in Ballston Spa, New York, United States. It is part of the Ballston Spa Central School District, which covers the towns of Ballston, Milton, and Malta in Saratoga County.  The mascot is the Scottie dog, dedicated to long-time athletic director/coach Coach William R. Scott. The school colors are Purple and Gold but the complementary (alternative) color of black is often used.

The high school was shifted to a new building in 1998; it remains on the same campus as the previous high school, which now functions as a middle school. Prior to moving to current complex in the 1950s, Ballston Spa High School was located in what is now Malta Avenue Elementary School.  Graduating class sizes range from 300 to 400, resulting in a total student population of around 1,400.

Courses

Ballston Spa offers a variety of courses in many fields.  Students may take advanced courses in math, science or technology, or focus more on the arts.

Advisory periods

Each academic department maintains an "advisory room" and each teacher advisory hours.  Similar to a professor's office hours at college, these are provided so that students can seek help during their study halls.

Advanced coursework

Beginning in the middle school, students have the opportunity to accelerate in several subject areas.  This program continues into the high school, where classes have various levels to meet each student's individual academic needs.  Many classes are also offered as Advanced Placement courses to students who wish to challenge themselves and earn college credit.
In addition to AP courses, Ballston Spa offers special college classes, in which students are presented with college level material and may gain credit from local colleges.  Although enrollment into the college is not required to take a class, it is required to gain college credit for the class.  Students are charged a reduced fee to enroll in the college course. Ballston Spa is also very open-minded in regards to independent studies, including online coursework.

IB courses

Ballston Spa offers students the International Baccalaureate curriculum as of the fall of 2012.

Requirements

Updated course requirements and more information is provided in the Guidance section of the high school website, available at www.bscsd.org .

Athletics

Ballston Spa's athletic program is a member of the Suburban Council. The gymnasium at the high school is colloquially known as "The Ballston Garden." Ballston Spa offers many sports at the Modified, Freshman, Junior Varsity, and Varsity level for both boys and girls.  The currently offered Varsity sports are:

Varsity Boys' Teams
Football
Outdoor track and field
Baseball
Lacrosse
Tennis
Soccer
Swimming / Diving
Golf
Cross Country
Indoor Track and Field
Bowling
Basketball
Wrestling
Ice Hockey (merged program with Burnt Hills-Ballston Lake)
Cheerleading (Girls/Boys)
Robotics (Girls/Boys)

Varsity Girls' Teams
Outdoor Track and Field
Softball
Lacrosse
Tennis
Soccer
Swimming/Diving
Volleyball
Cross Country
Indoor Track and Field
Bowling
Basketball
Cheerleading (Girls/Boys)
Robotics (Girls/Boys)
Skiing (merged program with Burnt Hills-Ballston Lake) (2010-11 NYSPHSAA State Champions)

The Athletics section of the website contains a wealth of information on the athletics programs in the district, and is accessed through www.bscsd.org.

Arts

Ballston Spa's arts program is and has a large number of motivated student participants.  In school students can choose from a wide range of art, music theory/history, and performance oriented classes, which take advantage of Ballston Spa's art facilities, including a dark room, several kilns, and a well-equipped auditorium/theatre.

Performing groups

A number of musical performing groups are offered through the music department, including a
Symphonic Band along with an audition-only Wind Ensemble, and a Jazz Band directed by Mr. Retersdorf. The Symphonic and Concert Orchestras are directed by Mrs. Reeves.
Also, a Concert and Women's Choirs along with the audition-only Select Choir.

These groups perform at least twice a year, with concerts in December and May, occasionally performing at a special concert in March.  Members from the groups also use their musical talents in the community on a regular basis, organized mainly by Ballston Spa's chapter of the Tri-M Music Honor Society.  Members of the band, for example, have performed on the street corners and Maplewood Manor, a local nursing home, around Christmas, while chorus members have gone caroling both in downtown Ballston Spa and at a local respite home.

Some also consider the Intro to Theatre and Intro to Acting classes as performing groups, as students in these classes put on a "Scene Night" for both their midterm and final exams.  For Scene Night, students prepare scenes that they either wrote themselves or found in plays that they read, and then perform them live for an audience in January and again in June.

Troupe

Ballston Spa's extracurricular theatre club is known as Troupe, and current director Matthew Lopez puts on two shows a year, the fall show typically being a smaller show or drama and the spring show being a large musical.

2007 marked the retirement of longtime director Pat Pacelli, with whom Larson would switch on and off with. Before Larson joined the district in 2000, Pacelli had been the sole director since the early 1990s. She had acted as first choreographer and then producer for Don Mitola, the previous director, taking over the directing position when he retired. Pacelli herself had attended Ballston Spa, and had been involved in theatre as a student.
 
The Troupe was originally a separate group from the school-sponsored theatre club. Its origin, in 1977, was as a small traveling performance group with the goal of interesting elementary students in theatre. This group was spawned from the highly successful school theatre program, as was the Spa Theatre Company. All of these groups were under the direction of Don Mitola and Harry Smith. In the 1980s the school program adopted the Troupe name and logo as its own.

Extracurricular
Of note are several academic-related teams. Ballston Spa's Science Olympiad team, advised by physics teachers, placed fourth in regionals for the 2006 season, and has frequently gone to state competitions. Of more recent note, the team placed 3rd at regionals and a new school record of 23rd in states for the 2008 season. The team also finished 3rd in the 2010 season. The Mock Trial team, advised by a history teacher, also has a good record, placing well in the 2006-2007 season.  A Biology teacher runs the Envirothon team, which placed very well at states in the 2007 season.  Ballston Spa also has an Odyssey of the Mind team.

National Honor Society

The Ballston Spa Chapter of the National Honor Society contains over fifty members from the Junior and Senior classes and is very active in the Ballston Spa community.

Student life

Throughout the year, student groups sponsor a wide variety of fundraisers and activities, such as the Homecoming Chicken BBQ, Pizza and Wings Night (area pizza places are invited to send in samples, and students vote for their favorite), Amnesty International sponsored Coffeehouses, the Talent Show, the annual Foreign Language Lip-Sync night, a "Mr. Ballstonian" contest, and Ballstonian Idol (an American Idol parody).  These events have been known to gather large audiences and are popular among the students. Dances are held yearly at Ballston Spa.  The first two, Homecoming and Fire and Ice (held homecoming weekend and mid-February, respectively), are sponsored by the Congress of Student Legislators, while the Senior Prom is put on in mid-late May, typically at SPAC's Hall of Springs.

See also
New York State Education Department
University of the State of New York
Education in the United States

References

External links
Ballston Spa Central School District home page

Public high schools in New York (state)
Schools in Saratoga County, New York